Volkhov hydroelectric plant, named after V.I. Lenin, is a hydroelectric station on the Volkhov River located in the town of Volkhov, Leningrad Oblast, in northwestern Russia. It is the oldest and longest serving hydroelectric plant in Soviet Union and Russia.  It is a part of the Ladoga cascade.

Construction work started in 1918. On September 16, 1921 it was included into a GOELRO plan. Genrikh Graftio, one of the founders of the plan, was in charge of the construction of the station. The plant was completed in 1927 with a capacity of 6,000 kilowatts.

In 1993—1996 3 hydroturbines were replaced by a new 12 MW units, other units are planned to be replaced in 2007—2010. After these replacements, the plant is estimated to achieve total power of 98 MW.

References

External links 

 Official site of JSC TGC-1
 Volhov HEP on LenHydroProject official website

Energy infrastructure completed in 1927
TGC-1
Hydroelectric power stations built in the Soviet Union
Hydroelectric power stations in Russia
Buildings and structures in Leningrad Oblast
Cultural heritage monuments of federal significance in Leningrad Oblast